Gian Francesco Gonçalves Mariano (September 19, 1982), known only by Gian, is a Brazilian footballer who acts as a defender. Currently playing for Mirassol.

Career
Gian started his career at Rio Branco, Brazil.

The player also had spells at Mogi Mirim, Clube Atlético Juventus São Paulo, Marília and Jaipur.

Career statistics
(Correct )

References

External links
 

1982 births
Living people
Brazilian footballers
CR Vasco da Gama players
FC Lugano players
Avaí FC players
Associação Atlética Ponte Preta players
Mirassol Futebol Clube players
Association football central defenders